Fantasy Wars (formerly Mythic Wars) is a fantasy turn-based tactical video game developed by Russian studio Ino-Co and published by 1C Company and Atari SA. It was followed by Elven Legacy in 2009.

Gameplay
Fantasy Wars features four playable races (humans, orcs, elves and dwarves). The single-player story includes three campaigns, taking place over a series of tactical hex maps. The game uses a 3D game engine and includes role-playing video game gameplay features such as experience points and skills.

Plot

Release

Fantasy Wars was distributed electronically by GamersGate and GOG and was published in Europe by Nobilis France. The game is distributed in Scandinavia by Paradox Interactive and in North America by Atari SA.

Reception

The game received "average" reviews according to the review aggregation website Metacritic.

Sequel
In April 2008, Paradox Interactive announced a sequel to Fantasy Wars entitled Elven Legacy. Elven Legacy is developed by 1C:Ino-Co and was released in April 2009.

References

External links
Fantasy Wars (official website)
Fantasy Wars (Ino-Co's website)
Fantasy Wars (1C website)

2007 video games
1C Company games
Fantasy video games
Multiplayer and single-player video games
Paradox Interactive games
Turn-based tactics video games
Video games developed in Russia
Windows games
Windows-only games